The R527 is a regional road in County Limerick, Ireland. It mainly follows former routes of the N18 and N24 in Limerick city.

References 

 Roads Act 1993 (Classification of Regional Roads) Order 2006 – Department of Transport

Regional roads in the Republic of Ireland
Roads in County Limerick